Lucky Dissanayake Jayawardana  is a Sri Lankan politician who is a member of parliament United National Party for Kandy District and also the minister of city planning, water supply and higher education.

Jayawardana started his political career from the first Provincial Council election held in 1988. There he became chief whip of the government and later the vice chairman of the council.

He was re-elected to the central provincial council from election held in the year 1993 and was appointed as the Minister of  Road Development, Power and energy, Housing and Construction, Transport, Sports, Youth Affair, Art and Culture, Corporative Development, Food Supply and Distribution and Rural Development. At the meantime, he was appointed as the Chief Organizer for Udunuwara electorate of United National Party by President D.B. Wijethunga.
Thereafter he was elected as a  Member of Parliament for Kandy District from the General election held in 1994. Since the United National Party was in the opposition he had to represent the opposition.

In the year 2000 Lucky Jayawardana was re-elected as a member of Parliament for Kandy District. Parliament was dissolved within a year and Jayawardana was able to secure his parliament seat from the election held in 2001 was appointed as the minister of Land & Deeds.  Meanwhile, he also acted as the Chairman of the Kandy district Development Committee
In 2004 he contested as the chief minister candidate from the united national party.
From 2004 to 2009 he was the chief whip of the opposition and also the general secretary for Kandy District of the United National Party. Later in 2013 he was made the Chief Minister Candidate for  Provincial council elections and after the election, he was appointed as the Opposition Leader in the central province. After the 2015 general election he was reelected to the Sri Lankan parliament as a member.

Jayawardana was later appointed as a state minister. He is also chairing the sectoral oversight committee on Health and social welfare. In addition he is the chairman of Kandy district development committee. He previously served as the state minister for hill country new township, infrastructure and community development and in mid 2018 was appointed as the state minister of city planning and water supply.

He is married to Achala Wijethunge and together they have two sons, Madhava and Shamal Jayawardana.

References

Politicians from Kandy
Members of the 10th Parliament of Sri Lanka
Members of the 11th Parliament of Sri Lanka
Members of the 12th Parliament of Sri Lanka
Members of the 15th Parliament of Sri Lanka